Irampanel (INN, code name BIIR-561) is a drug which acts as a dual noncompetitive antagonist of the AMPA receptor and neuronal voltage-gated sodium channel blocker. It was under development by Boehringer Ingelheim for the treatment of acute stroke/cerebral ischemia but never completed clinical trials for this indication. Irampanel was also trialed, originally, for the treatment of epilepsy and pain, but these indications, too, were abandoned, and the drug was ultimately never marketed.

References

AMPA receptor antagonists
Anticonvulsants
Dimethylamino compounds
Neuroprotective agents
Oxadiazoles
Sodium channel blockers
Abandoned drugs